The Brain That Wouldn't Die (also known as The Head That Wouldn't Die or The Brain That Couldn't Die) is a 1962 American science fiction horror film directed by Joseph Green and written by Green and Rex Carlton. The film was completed in 1959 under the working title The Black Door but was not theatrically released until May 3, 1962, when it was released under its new title as a double feature with Invasion of the Star Creatures.

The film focuses upon a mad doctor who develops a means to keep human body parts alive. He keeps his fiancée's severed head alive for days, and also keeps a lumbering, malformed brute (one of his earlier failed experiments) imprisoned in a closet.

The specific plot device of a mad doctor who discovers a way to keep a human head alive had been used in fiction earlier (such as Professor Dowell's Head from 1925), as well as other variants on this theme. It shares several key plot devices with the West German horror film The Head (1959).

The film was in the public domain in the United States from the day of its release due to a flawed copyright notice.

Plot 

Dr. Bill Cortner saves a patient who had been pronounced dead, but the senior surgeon, Bill's father, condemns his son's unorthodox methods and theories of transplanting.

While driving to his family's country house, Bill and his beautiful fiancée Jan Compton become involved in a car-accident that decapitates her. Bill recovers her severed head and rushes to his country house basement laboratory. He and his crippled assistant Kurt revive the head in a liquid-filled tray. But Jan's new existence is agony, and she begs Bill to let her die. He ignores her pleas, and she grows to resent him.

Bill decides to commit murder to obtain a body for Jan. He hunts for a suitable specimen at a burlesque nightclub, on the streets, and at a beauty-contest. Jan begins communicating telepathically with a hideous mutant, an experiment gone wrong, locked in a laboratory cell. When Kurt leaves a hatch in the cell door unlocked, the monster grabs and tears off Kurt's arm. Kurt dies from his injuries.

Bill lures an old girlfriend, figure-model Doris Powell, to his house, promising to study her scarred face for plastic surgery. He drugs her and carries her to the laboratory. Jan protests Bill's plan to transplant her head onto Doris's body. He tapes Jan's mouth shut.

When Bill goes to quiet the monster, it grabs Bill through the hatch and breaks the door from its hinges. Their struggles set the laboratory ablaze. The monster, a seven-foot giant with a horribly deformed head, bites a chunk from Bill's neck. Bill dies, and the monster carries the unconscious Doris to safety. As the lab goes up in flames, Jan says "I told you to let me die". The screen goes black, followed by Jan's maniacal cackle, welcoming her long awaited death.

Cast

Production 
The film was shot independently around Tarrytown, New York, in 1959 under the working title The Black Door. The title was later changed to The Head That Wouldn't Die. Some prints of the film use both the opening title The Brain That Wouldn't Die and the closing title The Head That Wouldn't Die.

The monster in the closet was played, in his first cinematic role, by Eddie Carmel, a well-known Mandatory Palestine-born circus performer, who worked under the name "The Jewish Giant". He was the subject of a photograph by Diane Arbus, titled "The Jewish Giant at Home with His Parents in the Bronx, N.Y., 1970".

The main theme, titled "The Web", was composed by Abe Baker and Tony Restaino and was noted for creating a sinister mood.

Release 
The movie was picked up for release by AIP and released in 1962 on a double bill with Invasion of the Star Creatures. AIP cut it for theatrical release.

Home media 
An uncut, 35 mm print was used in the Special Edition release by Synapse Films in 2002. Running 85 minutes, this version features more of the stripper catfight, as well as some extra gore.

In December 2015, Shout! Factory released a Blu-ray edition of the uncut film, with a high-definition transfer taken from the negative.

Mystery Science Theater 3000 episode 
The film was featured in episode 513 of Mystery Science Theater 3000. This film was the first movie watched by Mike Nelson in Mystery Science Theater 3000, after he replaced Joel Robinson (Joel Hodgson) on the series. Jan in the Pan is the nickname given to the female lead by the characters on the show.

In a poll of Bring Back MST3K Kickstarter backers, which raised money for an eleventh season of the show, The Brain that Wouldn't Die was ranked #23. Writer Jim Vorel ranked the episode considerably lower, at #125 in his ranking of MST3K's 191 episodes, saying, "It’s a dark, fairly ugly movie with extremely cheap sets, but Mike’s presence puts the crew into an upbeat, energetic state that contrasts nicely with it."

The MST3K episode was released on VHS by Rhino Home Video in 1996 and as a single-disc DVD in April 2000; the uncut version of the original movie was also included as a bonus feature. On November 26, 2013, Shout! Factory re-released the MST3K version as a bonus feature part of its 25th Anniversary DVD boxed set.

Reception and legacy 
Author and film critic Leonard Maltin awarded the film 1.5 out of 4 stars, calling it "poorly produced".
On his website Fantastic Movie Musings and Ramblings, Dave Sindelar gave the film a mostly negative review, noting that, although it managed to work up a certain amount of tension and featured some good gore effects, it was ruined by its lack of likable and intelligent characters and its "inability to decide just how it wants to be taken".

Brian J. Dillard from AllMovie said of the film, "Hokey, overwrought, and poorly paced, this venerable creature feature still commands a sizable following on the basis of its campy, low-grade special effects, its T&A exploitation, and its many pseudo-philosophical soliloquies".
TV Guide awarded the film 2 out of 4 stars, calling it "one of the most genuinely bizarre 'brain' movies".

Adaptations 
The movie also inspired the musical stage production The Brain That Wouldn't Die! In 3D!!! by Tom Sivak and Elizabeth Gelman, that premiered at the New York Musical Theatre Festival in October 2011.

In 2015, Pug Bujeaud's musical theatrical production The HEAD! That Wouldn't Die was mounted in Olympia, Washington by Theater Artists Olympia. Lyrics and music were written by the ensemble cast and the TAO collective.

Soon thereafter, Hollywood screenwriter Bruce Bernhard adapted the script as a staged musical comedy, creating a completely new score for it with songwriter Chris Cassone. The official world premiere for The Brain That Wouldn’t Die!…the Musical was at the Footlight Players Theatre in Charleston, South Carolina on October 13, 2016.

A satirical feature film adaptation of the same title was filmed on location in Portland, Oregon. The film premiered on June 21, 2020, as part of the Portland Horror Film Festival.

In popular culture 
 The film was featured on the nationally syndicated television show Cinema Insomnia, hosted by Mr. Lobo.
On October 23, 2020, the YouTube channels OutsideXbox and Outside Xtra livestreamed the movie as a part of their yearly Hallowstream 2020 celebration.
 The film inspired the title and premise of the stage play The Head that Wouldn't Die by Rand Higbee.

See also 
 Isolated brain
 Eyes Without a Face, a 1960 horror film about organ transplantation.
 The Brain, another film released in 1962 featuring an isolated brain.
 Donovan's Brain, a 1953 black-and-white science fiction horror film featuring Nancy Davis (later Nancy Reagan).
Re-Animator (1985 film), another take on the subject, loosely based on a Lovecraft novelette, spawning two sequels and a cult status.
The Man with Two Brains

References

Further reading

External links 

Said MST3K episode on official YouTube channeland ShoutFactoryTV
The entire movie on Internet Archive

1962 films
1962 horror films
1960s science fiction horror films
American science fiction horror films
American exploitation films
American independent films
American International Pictures films
American black-and-white films
1960s English-language films
1960s exploitation films
Mad scientist films
1960s monster movies
American splatter films
Films shot in New York (state)
Articles containing video clips
1962 directorial debut films
1960s American films